The 1st Canadian Folk Music Awards were held on December 10, 2005, at the Canadian Museum of Civilization in Gatineau, Quebec.

Nominees and recipients
Recipients are listed first and highlighted in boldface.

Best Album - Traditional
 Le Vent du Nord - Les Amants du Saint-Laurent
 Ian Robb, James Stevens, Ian Clark and Greg T. Browne - Jiig
 Michael Jerome Browne - Michael Jerome Browne and the Twin Rivers String Band
 Frank Maher and the Mahers Bahers - Mahervelous
 Les Chauffeurs à Pieds - Déjeuner canadien

Best Album - Contemporary
 Nathan - Jimson Weed
 The Bills - Let 'Em Run
 The Clumsy Lovers - Smart Kid
 David Francey - Waking Hour
 Jenny Whiteley - Hopetown

Best Singer - Traditional
 Ian Robb - Jiig
 Mary Jane Lamond - Storas

Best Singer - Contemporary
 Lynn Miles - Love Sweet Love
 Dave Gunning - Two Bit World
 John Wort Hannam - Dynamite and Dozers
 Gordie Sampson - Sunburn
 Connie Kaldor - Sky with Nothing to Get In the Way

Best Instrumental Solo
 J. P. Cormier - X8: A Mandolin Collection
 Jaime RT - Reach
 Duane Andrews - Duane Andrews
 Bob Evans - The Voice in the Grain
 Frank Maher - Mahervelous

Best Instrumental Group
 Beyond the Pale - Consensus

Best Songwriter - English
 Lynn Miles - Love Sweet Love
 Melwood Cutlery - Campfire
 Connie Kaldor - Sky with Nothing to Get In the Way
 James Keelaghan - Then Again
 Joel Plaskett - La De Da

Best Vocal Group
 Nathan - Jimson Weed
 The Clumsy Lovers - Smart Kid
 House of Doc - Prairie Grass
 Po' Girl - Vagabond Lullabies
 The Wailin' Jennys - 40 Days

Best Solo Artist
 Harry Manx - West Eats Meet
 Kyp Harness - The Miracle Business
 Gordie Sampson - Sunburn
 Danielle Martineau - Les Secrets du vent
 Belinda Bruce - Dream Yourself Awake

Best Ensemble
Genticorum - Malins plaisirs
The Bills - Let 'Em Run
The Clumsy Lovers - Smart Kid
Nathan - Jimson Weed
Le Vent du Nord - Les Amants du Saint-Laurent

Best World Artist Solo
 Alpha Yaya Diallo - Djama
 Mary Jane Lamond - Storas

Best New/Emerging Artist
 Karla Anderson - The Embassy Sessions
 Jill Barber - Oh Heart
 Belinda Bruce - Dream Yourself Awake
 John Wort Hannam - Dynamite and Dozers 
 House of Doc - Prairie Grass

Producer of the Year
 Steve Dawson - Jenny Whiteley/Hopetown
 Jordy Sharp - Harry Manx/West Eats Meet
 J. P. Cormier - J. P. Cormier/The Long River
 Aquarius Records - Jorane/The You and the Now
 Vince Ditrich - House of Doc/Prairie Grass
 Tom Wilson and Bob Lanois - Tom Wilson and Bob Lanois/The Shack Recordings

Pushing the Boundaries
 Creaking Tree String Quartet - Side Two
 The Bills - Let 'Em Run
 Harry Manx - West Eats Meet
 Duane Andrews - Duane Andrews
 Geoff Berner - Whiskey Rabbi

References

External links
Canadian Folk Music Awards

01
Canadian Folk Music Awards
Canadian Folk Music Awards
Canadian Folk Music Awards
Canadian Folk Music Awards